2006 Czech Lion Awards ceremony was held on 3 March 2007.

Winners and nominees

Non-statutory Awards

References

2006 film awards
Czech Lion Awards ceremonies